The 1962 Philadelphia Eagles season was the franchise's 30th season in the National Football League.

Offseason 
The 1962 NFL Draft and the 1962 AFL Draft

Regular season

Schedule 

Note: Intra-conference opponents are in bold text.

Standings

External links
 Eagles on Pro Football Reference
 Eagles on jt-sw.com

Philadelphia Eagles seasons
Philadelphia Eagles
Philadel